Michael Alfred Spender (11 November 1906 – 5 May 1945) was an English explorer, surveyor, a leader in photo interpretation in the Second World War, and an RAF squadron leader.

Personal life 
He was the eldest son of Harold Spender and Violet, and a brother of the poet Stephen Spender and the artist Humphrey Spender.

He graduated from Balliol College, Oxford University, with a double first in Engineering, and then worked as a surveyor on the Great Barrier Reef from 1928 to 1929 and in East Greenland in 1932 and 1933. In 1935 he joined an expedition to the Himalayas and mapped 26 peaks over 26,000 feet.

In 1933 he married his first wife Erika Haarmann, and their son John-Christopher was born in 1936. In the late 1930s the artist Nancy Sharp (the first wife of William Coldstream and the lover of Louis MacNeice), fell in love with Spender. Michael and Nancy divorced their respective spouses, and they were married in 1943. Their son Philip was born the same year.

Spender was regarded as arrogant and tactless, and he had a difficult relationship with his brother, Stephen.

Death 
On 3 May 1945 Michael was a passenger in an Avro Anson, and he was seriously injured when it crashed near Süchteln in Germany; he died on 5 May. Stephen was deeply affected, and he wrote the elegy Seascape for his brother.

He was buried at Eindhoven General Cemetery at Woensel in the Netherlands.

References

1906 births
1945 deaths
Alumni of Balliol College, Oxford
English explorers
Royal Air Force squadron leaders
Royal Air Force Volunteer Reserve personnel of World War II
Royal Air Force personnel killed in World War II
People from Kensington
Victims of aviation accidents or incidents in Germany
Victims of aviation accidents or incidents in 1945
Military personnel from London